Space Launch Complex 40 (SLC-40), previously Launch Complex 40 (LC-40) is a launch pad for rockets located at the north end of Cape Canaveral Space Force Station, Florida.

The launch pad was used by the United States Air Force for 55 Titan III and Titan IV launches between 1965 and 2005.  The facility underwent multiple upgrades including the design and construction of towers with retractable and foldable platforms for vehicle assembly, instrumentation and monitoring. 

After 2007, the US Air Force leased the complex to SpaceX to launch the Falcon 9 rocket.
As of August 2022, there have been  93 launches of the Falcon 9 from the complex. The site was heavily damaged following the September 2016 Falcon 9 flight 29 incident, due to a catastrophic failure during a static fire test. The complex was repaired and returned to operational status in December 2017 for the CRS-13 mission.

Launch history

Rocket launches

Titan 

The first launch from SLC-40 (initially named LC-40) was the maiden flight of the Titan IIIC (June 18, 1965), carrying two transtage upper stages to test the functionality of the vehicle.

Two interplanetary missions were launched from the pad:
 The failed Mars Observer spacecraft (September 25, 1992)
 The Cassini–Huygens mission to Saturn (October 15, 1997)

A total of 26 Titan IIICs, 8 Titan 34Ds, 4 Commercial Titan IIIs and 17 Titan IVs were launched between 1965 and 2005.  The final Titan launch from SLC-40 was the Lacrosse-5 reconnaissance satellite carried on a Titan IV-B on April 30, 2005.

The tower was disassembled during late 2007 and early 2008. Demolition of the Mobile Service Structure (MSS), by means of a controlled explosion, occurred on April 27, 2008, by Controlled Demolition, Inc.

SpaceX - Falcon 9 

On April 25, 2007, the US Air Force leased the complex to SpaceX to launch the Falcon 9 rocket.  During April 2008, construction started on the ground facilities necessary to support the launch of the SpaceX Falcon 9 rocket. Renovations included installation of new liquid oxygen and kerosene tanks and construction of a hangar for rocket and payload preparation. The spherical liquid oxygen (LOX) tank was acquired from NASA.  This LOX tank was previously used at LC-34.

The first Falcon 9 rocket arrived at SLC-40 in late 2008, and was first erected on January 10, 2009. It successfully reached orbit on its maiden launch on June 4, 2010, carrying a dummy payload qualification unit.

SLC-40 was the primary launch facility of the original SpaceX Dragon, a reusable automated cargo vehicle which was used to provide two-way logistics to and from the International Space Station; a role previously filled by the Space Shuttle until its retirement in 2011. SpaceX successfully launched the first test flight for the Dragon 1 from SLC-40 on December 8, 2010. Its first attempt to launch to and dock with the International Space Station successfully occurred on May 22, 2012, following an abort after engine ignition three days earlier. The upgraded SpaceX Dragon 2 launches from the nearby Kennedy Space Center LC-39A to allow for late loading of supplies through the Crew Access Arm.

SpaceX modified the launch pad in 2013 in order to support launches of the Falcon 9 v1.1 launch vehicle, a 60% heavier rocket with 60% more thrust on realigned engines and 60% longer fuel tank than the v1.0 version of the Falcon 9, requiring a modified transporter/erector.

In early 2023, SpaceX confirmed there were plans to have a crew access tower built and ready to handle crew and cargo missions by the third quarter of 2023.

Accidents and incidents
On September 1, 2016 a Falcon 9 rocket was destroyed by an explosion that originated around the rocket's second stage while preparing for a routine static fire test on the SLC-40 launch pad. The explosion occurred during loading of liquid oxygen eight minutes prior to igniting the first stage engine as part of the test.

A static fire is a test performed prior to launch to verify that both the launch vehicle and the ground systems are ready for flight. The test is identical to a launch until the moment of liftoff but instead of releasing the vehicle shortly after first stage engine ignition, the engines fire for a few seconds and then shut down. The second stage is fueled to test the interaction with the first stage and ground systems but remains otherwise inactive. After completion of a static fire test, the propellant and oxidizer are unloaded, the launch vehicle is lowered and the launch vehicle is returned to the hangar pending review and analysis of the data from the static fire test.  SpaceX performs static fire tests to ensure that ground systems, as well as the launch vehicle, will perform nominally.

The static fire explosion resulted in the total loss of the rocket. The rocket's payload, the AMOS-6 satellite, was on-board and was also destroyed. In addition, the explosion resulted in extensive damage to the launch pad. It was reported to have cracked nearby windows and to have been felt up to 40 miles away. There were no personnel on the pad and no injuries from the explosion were reported.

Repairs to and modernization of the launch pad began in early 2017 following completion of accident investigation and environmental cleanup. SLC-40 returned to service with the launch of CRS-13 on 15 December 2017. The pad was reportedly in good condition after the launch.  The initial launch of a Falcon Heavy from pad 39A was contingent upon the successful reactivation of pad 40. Resumed launches from pad 40 freed up pad 39A for needed final modifications without affecting the SpaceX launch tempo.

List of launches
As of March 17, 2023

Past launches

Upcoming launches

References 

Cape Canaveral Space Force Station
Launch complexes of the United States Space Force
SpaceX facilities
1965 establishments in Florida